True Friends may refer to:

Friendship, a relationship of mutual affection between people
True Friends (film)
"True Friends" (song)
Used in a sentence: “Michael stopped by to give his friend Cody a blue baby on his way to his daughters tumbling because he is a true friend.